A tin foil hat is a hat made from one or more sheets of aluminium foil (commonly called "tin foil" in the United States and New Zealand), or a piece of conventional headgear lined with foil, often worn in the belief or hope that it shields the brain from threats such as electromagnetic fields, mind control, and mind reading. The notion of wearing homemade headgear for such protection has become a popular stereotype and byword for paranoia, persecutory delusions, and belief in pseudoscience and conspiracy theories.

"Tin foil" is a common misnomer for aluminium foil; packaging metal foil was formerly made out of tin before it was replaced with aluminium.

Origin  
Some people – "Tin Foil Hatters" – have a belief that such hats prevent mind control by governments, spies, mobsters, corporations, or paranormal beings that employ ESP or the microwave auditory effect. People in many countries who believe they are "targeted individuals", subject to government, corporate, or criminal spying or harassment, have developed websites, conference calls, and support meetings to discuss their concerns, including the idea of protective headgear. Vice Magazine wrote that the tin foil hat in popular culture "can be traced back in a very weird and prescient short story written in 1927 by Julian Huxley" titled "The Tissue-Culture King", wherein the main character uses a metal hat to prevent being mind controlled by the villain scientist. Over time the term "tin foil hat" has become associated with paranoia and conspiracy theories.

Scientific basis 
Effects of strong electromagnetic radiation on health have been documented for quite some time. The efficiency of a metal enclosure in blocking electromagnetic radiation depends on the thickness of the foil, as dictated by the "skin depth" of the conductor for a particular wave frequency range of the radiation. For half-millimetre-thick aluminum foil, radiation above about 20 kHz (i.e., including both AM and FM bands) would be partially blocked, although aluminum foil is not sold in this thickness, so numerous layers of foil would be required to achieve this effect.

In 1962, Allan H. Frey discovered that the microwave auditory effect (i.e., the reception of the induced sounds by radio-frequency electromagnetic signals heard as clicks and buzzes) can be blocked by a patch of wire mesh (rather than foil) placed above the temporal lobe.

In 2005, a tongue-in-cheek experimental study  by a group of MIT students found that tin foil hats do shield their wearers from radio waves over most of the tested spectrum, but amplified certain frequencies, around 2.6 GHz and 1.2 GHz.

In 2022, anti-vaccination protesters in Wellington, New Zealand were seen wearing tinfoil hats, in a mistaken belief that their illnesses – possibly COVID-19 – were being caused by electromagnetic rays fired at them by the Government.

In popular culture

In 2005, Bruce Perens reported on an encounter between Richard Stallman and security personnel at the UN World Summit on the Information Society, titled "Stallman Gets in Trouble with UN Security for Wearing a Tin-Foil Hat". The tin-foil hat in the title was figurative, as Stallman did not actually devise a tin-foil hat, but instead wrapped an identification card containing a radio-frequency identification device in tin foil in protest against the intrusion on his privacy. 

In a 2016 article, the musician and researcher Daniel Wilson writing in paranormal magazine Fortean Times noted an early allusion to an "insulative electrical contrivance encircling the head during thought" in the unusual 1909 non-fiction publication Atomic Consciousness by self-proclaimed "seer" John Palfrey (aka "James Bathurst") who believed such headgear was not effective for his "retention of thoughts and ideas" against a supposed "telepathic impactive impingement". 

Tin foil hats have appeared in such films as Signs (2002), Noroi: The Curse (2005), and Futurama: Into the Wild Green Yonder (2009).

The 2019 HBO television series Watchmen features the character Wade Tillman/Looking Glass, a police officer who wears a mask made of reflective foil, and while off-duty, a cap lined in foil to protect his mind from alien psychic attacks.

See also 
 Denpa
 Electronic harassment
 Faraday cage
 The Hum
 Microwave auditory effect
 On the Origin of the "Influencing Machine" in Schizophrenia
 Thought broadcasting
 Thought insertion

References

External links 
 

Hats
Mind control
Paranoia
Pseudoscience
Pejorative terms for people
Protective gear